Sara Khan or Sarah Khan may refer to:
 Sara Khan (activist) (born 1980), British activist
 Sara Khan (actress, born 1985), Indian actress
 Sara Khan (actress, born 1989), Indian actress
 Sarah Mahboob Khan (born 1991), Pakistani tennis player
 Sara Ali Khan (born 1995, Indian actress and daughter of Saif Ali Khan
 Sara Raza Khan (fl. 2009–2016), Pakistani singer
 Sarah Khan (fl. 2012–present), Pakistani actress in Urdu

See also
 Saira Khan (born 1970), British television personality and celebrity